Sergiy Gladyr (born October 17, 1988) is a Ukrainian former professional basketball player. He was selected with the 49th overall pick by the Atlanta Hawks in the 2009 NBA draft.

Professional career
Gladyr began his career with one of the smallest teams in the Ukrainian Super League, MBС Mykolaiv.

Gladyr shot 47% on three-point shots and 90% on free throws in the Ukrainian Super League, during the 2007–08 season, before taking a slight step back in his shooting percentages in the 2008–09 season (shooting 36% from three-point range and 81% from the free throw line respectively). During the 2008–09 season, he exploded for a season high of 36 points against Khimik Yuzhny, in a game where he got to the free throw line 19 times. Gladyr helped MBС Mykolaiv to a fifth-place finish in the Ukrainian Super League in the 2008–09 season, by averaging 15.4 points per game.

In July 2009, Gladyr signed a three-year deal with Bàsquet Manresa of the Liga ACB. In August 2012, he signed with Baloncesto Fuenlabrada for the 2012–13 season.

On October 1, 2013, Gladyr signed a one-year deal with the French EuroLeague team JSF Nanterre.

On August 21, 2014, he signed with SLUC Nancy Basket for the 2014–15 season. In 33 games of the French Pro A he averaged 12.1 points and 3.5 rebounds per game.

On August 25, 2015, it was announced that he signed with İstanbul BB of the Turkish Basketball League, however the team rescinded the contract after he failed the physical. On September 9, he signed with AS Monaco Basket of the French LNB Pro A.

NBA
Gladyr was drafted by the NBA team the Atlanta Hawks in the second round of the 2009 NBA Draft, with the 49th pick overall. He did not play for an NBA summer league team after the draft since the Atlanta Hawks did not field a team, but he did show up for the Hawks rookie mini-camp. He played for the Hawks in the NBA Summer League in 2010 and 2013.

In 2017, his draft rights were traded to the Cleveland Cavaliers.

Player profile
Gladyr is a classic two-guard. He's got a phenomenal shooting touch in addition to his athleticism, which allows him to easily pass by defenders and dunk the ball over them. He's turned into a real showman during the 2008–09 season in Ukraine, with the April All-Star Game  highlighting his performance: Gladyr scored a game-high 24 points and also dished out nine assists. He also set his home crowd on fire as he took the 3-point shootout title, defeating BC Kyiv's Manuchar Markoishvili in the final.

Personal life
Sergiy Gladyr is married to Olena Khomrova, a Ukrainian fencer. They have one daughter, Eva.

References

External links
ACB.com profile 
Draftexpress.com profile
Eurobasket.com profile
Euroleague.net profile
FIBA.com profile

1988 births
Living people
2014 FIBA Basketball World Cup players
AS Monaco Basket players
Atlanta Hawks draft picks
Baloncesto Fuenlabrada players
Bàsquet Manresa players
Expatriate basketball people in Monaco
Nanterre 92 players
Liga ACB players
MBC Mykolaiv players
Sportspeople from Mykolaiv
Shooting guards
SLUC Nancy Basket players
Ukrainian expatriate basketball people in France
Ukrainian expatriate basketball people in Spain
Ukrainian expatriates in Monaco
Ukrainian men's basketball players